Harold Theodore Spitznagel (December 7, 1896 – April 26, 1975) was an American architect from South Dakota. Spitznagel was best known for residential and institutional architecture, including the original Mount Rushmore visitor center. His styles included Prairie School, Art Deco, and Moderne architecture. He graduated from the University of Pennsylvania, was posthumously inducted into the South Dakota Hall of Fame, and has been called the "foremost 20th-century architect" of the state of South Dakota.

Life

Early life and education 
Spitznagel was born in Sioux Falls, South Dakota, on December 7, 1896, to Mary and Charles Spitznagel. He graduated from Washington High School in 1916. For two years he attended the Art Institute of Chicago, and earned his Bachelor of Architecture degree from the University of Pennsylvania in 1925. At school he won the American Institute of Architects and Arthur Spayd Brooke design awards. For a brief time after graduation, Spitznagel was an assistant instructor in architecture at the University of Pennsylvania.

Career 
Spitznagel worked in Indianapolis for six months, then moved to Chicago. There he was an architect first for Burnham Brothers (commercial design, 1926), then Graven and Mayger (movie theaters, 1926-1927), and finally Schmidt, Garden, and Erickson (commercial design and hospitals, 1927-1929). The latter firm was influential in Chicago's Prairie School style of residential architecture. In 1930 at the beginning of the Great Depression, Spitznagel returned home to Sioux Falls and opened an office in the Western Surety Building on Eighth Street and Main Avenue. He remodeled this office into the Art Deco style.

Spitznagel and his firms (Harold Spitznagel Architects, Harold Spitznagel & Associates, Inc., and The Spitznagel Partners, Inc.) designed many buildings, especially in South Dakota, in the 1930s through 1970s. His first work was residential and small retail, and in 1936 the city commissioned him to design the Sioux Falls City Hall. This Moderne building included limestone plaques, granite carvings, frescoes and—controversially—no cornice. Spitznagel incorporated a significant amount of art in the building design, influenced by Palmer Eide of Augustana College. Spitznagel and Eide collaborated over the next decades on buildings such as Jehovah Evangelical Lutheran Church in Saint Paul, Minnesota.

In the late 1930s, Senator Peter Norbeck asked Frank Lloyd Wright to submit a design for a new Custer State Park lodge. Wright toured the site but declined to participate. The park board then chose Spitznagel's firm to design the lodge, which included rustic and Deco elements. During World War II, Spitznagel was Director of Housing for Sioux Falls Army Air Field.

Spitznagel's mid-career was highlighted by institutional buildings: civic structures like city halls and post offices, arenas in Sioux Falls and Huron, and high-profile park buildings for the Mount Rushmore National Memorial and Custer State Park. The Mission 66 Mount Rushmore visitor center was finished in 1957 in a collaboration with Cecil Doty, and featured in the 1959 Alfred Hitchcock film North by Northwest.

Spitznagel designed hotels, country clubs, and movie theaters. Educational buildings were a particular specialty, and Spitznagel was the architect for buildings on the campuses of the University of South Dakota, South Dakota State University, and Augustana College. His firm took on many sacred architecture projects, including an award-winning church in Saint Paul, Minnesota: Jehovah Lutheran.

Spitznagel retired in June 1972 and died on April 26, 1975.

Legacy 
Spitznagel served as president of the South Dakota chapter of the American Institute of Architects in 1954–1955 and vice president of the national organization from 1966 to 1970.

His papers are in the archives of the University of Minnesota Libraries. Augustana College occasionally bestows a Harold Spitznagel Medal for Achievement in Art to students who demonstrate excellence in their field.

Work

Buildings

1930s

 Sioux Falls City Hall
 Peter Norbeck Visitor Center and Sylvan Lake Lodge, Custer State Park
 Sioux Falls residences
 Irving School and Lincoln High School addition in Sioux Falls; grade school in Ellsworth, Minnesota
 KSOO-FM radio station
 department store in Brookings, South Dakota
 Hollywood Theater in Sioux Falls

1940s
 John Morrell and Company Visitor Building, Sioux Falls
 South Dakota State Penitentiary cell block
 Sport Bowl, Sioux Falls
 Carpenter Hotel, Sioux Falls
 Sioux Falls residences
 Central Electric and Telephone Company, Sioux Falls
 retail stores
 Augustana College master plan

1950s

 Huron Arena, Huron, South Dakota
 YWCA, Sioux Falls
 Augustana College Commons
 First Congregational Church, Spencer, Iowa
 Church of St. Mary, Sioux Falls
 Our Savior’s Lutheran Church with chancel art by Robert Aldern, Sioux Falls
 Western Surety Company, Sioux Falls
 First Congregational Church, Rapid City
 Hanel Motor Hotel, Minneapolis
 Dowling Hall, University of St. Thomas (Minnesota), Saint Paul

1960s

 Sioux Falls Arena, Sioux Falls
 Mount Rushmore Visitor Center (original), with Cecil Doty
 Minnehaha Country Club, Sioux Falls
 National Bank of South Dakota, Sioux Falls
 USD Student Union, Vermillion
 Lincoln Senior High School, Sioux Falls
 Augustana College Science Building, Sioux Falls
 Holy Name Catholic Church, Watertown, South Dakota
 First Federal Savings and Loan, Sioux Falls
 Trinity Lutheran Church with suspended art by Palmer Eide, Spencer, Iowa
 American College Testing Program, Iowa City
 South Dakota State University Rotunda/Arts and Science/Home Economics and Nursing, dining hall, and dormitories
 Housing and Urban Development Housing for the Elderly, Pipestone, Minnesota
 Jehovah Lutheran Church, Saint Paul, Minnesota

1970s
 South Dakota State Library, Pierre
 Avera McKennan Hospital addition, Sioux Falls
 Federal office building, Aberdeen
 EROS Data Center, Garretson
 Minnehaha County Public Safety Building, Sioux Falls
 Rapid City Civic Center, Rapid City
 Hilton M. Briggs Library, South Dakota State University, Brookings
 Post office, Watertown, South Dakota
 Fine Arts Center, University of South Dakota, Vermillion

Awards 
 1935: House and Garden magazine feature
 1951: Better Homes and Gardens magazine feature
 1956: honorary doctorate from Augustana College
 1959: Fellow of the American Institute of Architects
 1962, 1970, 1975: Northwest Architect magazine feature
 1975: four-city, four-month posthumous exhibition
 2006: South Dakota Hall of Fame inductee, posthumously

References

Further reading 
  Catalog of a four-city posthumous exhibition.

External links 
 Harold Spitznagel papers, Northwest Architectural Archives at the University of Minnesota Libraries

Architects from South Dakota
People from Sioux Falls, South Dakota
1896 births
1975 deaths
Fellows of the American Institute of Architects
University of Pennsylvania alumni
School of the Art Institute of Chicago alumni
20th-century American architects
Modernist architects from the United States
Stadium architects
American residential architects
American theatre architects
American ecclesiastical architects